is a Japanese clan that emerged during the Sengoku period.

History
The clan claims descent from Taira clan through the Miura clan. Sometimes the kanji Kan-on characters "芦名" and "葦名" are used also. The name came from the area called Ashina in the city of Yokosuka in Kanagawa Prefecture.

Sagami-Ashina originated when Miura Yoshitsugu's third son adopted the name Ashina. Aizu-Ashina was descended from Miura Yoshiaki's son Sawara Yoshitsuru. During the Muromachi period the clan claimed the shugo of Aizu. In 1589 the clan suffered a severe loss against Date Masamune at the Battle of Suriagehara, leading to the demise of the clan.

In Popular Media

The Ashina play a prominent role in Futaroh Yamada's novel Yagyu Ninpocho where, following their defeat by Masamune, they went into hiding only to emerge years later as shinobi in service to the daimyō of Aizu. They also appear in the 2019 video game Sekiro: Shadows Die Twice, which takes place in a fantasy version of the Sengoku Jidai. One other appearance of the clan is in Total War: Shogun 2. They are a non playable clan that the player may interact with.

List of Head Family

 (Founder) Miura Yoshiaki (1092–1180)
 Sawara Yoshitsura, son of Yoshiaki
 Sawara Moritsura, son of Yoshitsura
 Ashina Mitsumori, son of Yoshitsura
 Ashina Yasumori, nephew of Mitsumori
 Ashina Morimune, son of Yasumori
 Ashina Morikazu (1285–1335), son of Morimune
 Ashina Naomori (1323–1391), brother of Morikazu
 Ashina Norimori (1346–1407), son of Naomori
 Ashina Morimune (1386–1434), son of Norimori
 Ashina Morihisa (1416–1444), son of Morimune
 Ashina Morinobu (1408–1451), brother of Morihisa
 Ashina Moriakira (1431–1466), son of Morinobu
 Ashina Moritaka (1448–1558), son of Moriakira
 Ashina Morishige (1482–1521), son of Moritaka
 Ashina Morikiyo (1490–1553), brother of Morishige
 Ashina Moriuji (1521–1561), son of Morikiyo
 Ashina Morioki (1547–1574), son of Moriuji
 Ashina Moritaka (1561–1584), brother of Morioki
 Ashina Kameomaru (1584–1586), son of Moritaka
 Ashina Yoshihiro (1575–1631), descendant of Sawara Yoshitsura’s brother.
 Ashina Moritoshi (1631–1651), son of Yoshihiro
 Ashina Sentsurumaru (1650–1653), son of Moritoshi

References 

Japanese clans